New Hampshire Route 26 (abbreviated NH 26) is a  state highway located in northern New Hampshire.  It runs across the state in a roughly northwest-to-southeast trajectory, stretching from the Vermont border in the west to the Maine border in the east.  NH 26 is a multi-state route with both states.

At its western end, NH 26 connects to Vermont Route 102 in Lemington via the extremely short, yet fully designated Vermont Route 26 (VT 26).  At  in length, it is by far the shortest state route in Vermont.  At its eastern end, NH 26 meets Maine State Route 26 which connects with the city of Portland in the south.

The number 26 dates from 1922, when the multi-state route was first designated New England Interstate Route 26 as part of the New England road marking system of the 1920s.

Route description

NH 26 is a mostly isolated highway which runs through mountainous terrain. The highway begins in the west at the state line between Lemington, Vermont and Colebrook, New Hampshire along the Connecticut River. It is connected to Vermont Route 102 via the short stub highway VT 26. The highway runs east into downtown Colebrook where it intersects with U.S. Route 3. NH 26 briefly overlaps with US 3 before splitting off east again towards Dixville (the southern end of the overlap is the historic northern terminus of New England Interstate Route 26). From Colebrook to Dixville, NH 26 runs tightly along the Mohawk River, a tributary of the Connecticut. The site of the  Balsams Grand Resort Hotel, which opened during the Civil War but was closed in 2011, is also located along NH 26. After leaving Dixville (which the "Notch" is a part of) NH 26 nicks the northeastern corner of the township of Millsfield before entering the town of Errol, where it meets its only other major intersection at NH 16. The two routes are briefly cosigned in the downtown area before NH 16 splits off to the northeast. NH 26, heading southeast, crosses the Androscoggin River and then runs along the southwestern side of Umbagog Lake. It passes through the northeastern corner of the township of Cambridge before crossing into Upton, Maine and continuing as Maine State Route 26 south (SR 26 is a north-south highway).

Vermont Route 26

Vermont Route 26 is the short connection between Vermont Route 102 and the New Hampshire state line. It is by far the shortest state route in Vermont.

History

The entirety of modern NH 26, VT 26 and Maine State Route 26 were initially designated New England Interstate Route 26 (NEI 26) as part of the New England road marking system introduced in 1922, following nearly the same exact route as today.  NEI 26 was known as the Dixville Notch Way and originally stretched from Portland in the south (where it connected to New England Interstate Route 1 - modern U.S. Route 1) to Colebrook in the north (where it connected to New England Interstate Route 6 - modern U.S. Route 3).  At some point, the route was extended to the Vermont state border to connect with what is now Vermont Route 102 in Lemington.  In 1925, the United States Numbered Highways supplanted the New England Interstate system and NEI 26 was redesignated as a set of state highways bearing the number 26.  The New Hampshire (and by extension, Vermont) section of the roadway has not undergone any significant changes since then.

NEI 26 was clearly intended to be a north-south highway, which SR 26 in Maine illustrates.  However, NH 26 is signed as an east-west highway, reflecting its orientation within the state.  This means that, in driving the old Interstate route from south to north, mileposts on NH 26 will actually be decreasing since mileposts normally increase from west to east.

Major intersections

References

External links

 New Hampshire State Route 26 on Flickr

Transportation in Coös County, New Hampshire
026